In My Blood (En Mi Sangre) is the third studio album by Gibraltarian Flamenco metal quintet Breed 77. This album was produced by Ron Saint-Germain (The Saint) noted for his work with Soundgarden, Tool, Creed and Bad Brains. It was slated for release July 3, 2006, but was eventually released on September 11, 2006. In My Blood (En Mi Sangre) has produced three singles, these being "Alive", "Look at Me Now", and "Blind". It was recorded in Monnow Valley Studio and Albert's Studio in London.

Track listing
All tracks written by Paul Isola, Danny Felice, Pedro Caparros López & Stuart Cavilla.

 "Petróleo (You Will Be King)" – 3:56
 "Empty Words" – 4:27
 "Viento de Levante" – 0:50
 "Blind" – 4:08
 "Remember That Day" – 4:41
 "Look at Me Now" – 4:30
 "So You Know" – 4:47
 "The Game" – 3:08
 "Alive" – 3:31
 "Libertad" – 5:58
 "Tears" – 5:28

References

2006 albums
Breed 77 albums